Elections to the Garo Hills Autonomous District Council (GHADC) were held on 12 April 2021.

There were 7.43 Lakh eligible voters in the elections. The votes were counted on 15 April 2021.

Schedule

Party candidates

Results
The counting was held on 15 April. No party could get a clear majority. The INC emerged single largest party by winning 12 seats.

By Party

By Constituency

Executive council formation
The new council was formed by the NPP, with the support of three independents, two BJP and the lone GNC councillor. Benedick R Marak took oath as the CEM, whereas Nikman Ch Marak became the Deputy CEM.

References

2021 elections in India
Elections in Meghalaya
Autonomous district council elections in India